Just You is 2013 Taiwanese idol romantic-comedy television series. The television drama was produced by Toei Productions Limited starring Aaron Yan and Puff Kuo as the main leads. It was first aired on June 21, 2013 on Sanlih TV after Big Red Riding Hood and last aired on November 8, 2013. It also inspired the storyline for the Turkish romantic comedy Her Yerde Sen, which aired in 2019.

Synopsis
Qi Yi (Aaron Yan) is a fastidious young man who is afraid of germs and needs to have everything in his life in his own orderly fashion. After he gives up a successful opportunity in New York, he returns to Taiwan and decides to buy a small marketing design company called GAZE, and his old childhood home. The problem is that the home has a peppy tenant, Chen Liang Liang (Puff Kuo), who refuses to move out. When he arrives at his newly acquired company, Qi Yi discovers that Liang Liang also works for his company. The happy-go-lucky Liang Liang just wants everything to be stable in her life, but she realizes that may be harder to maintain when her new boss starts making big changes in her workplace, including a notice stating that office romances will be prohibited. Slowly, Qi Yi starts to fall for Liang Liang, but sudden circumstances make Ding Jia Yu (Qi Yi's ex-girlfriend) come back into Qi Yi's life. Jia Yu plans to ruin things between Qi Yi and Liang Liang. Dean, an outgoing and charming friend of both, helps them solve the problems that arise due to Jia Yu. Dean soon falls for Liang Liang, though he doesn't reveal it and remains a supportive friend to her. The office also has other staff members who later find their life partners within the office. Liang Liang helps Qi Yi and his father find Qi Yi's mother, whom they haven't had contact with for 20 years. For this, and other acts, Qi Yi's dad finds Liang Liang to be a nice person. But Jia Yu is acquainted with Qi Yi's mother. Jia Yu keeps making herself seem like a victim of the choices she's made, causing Qi Yi to feel guilty and sympathize with her. Because Qi Yi wants to make things right, he starts paying more attention to Jia Yu's needs, ignoring Liang Liang and hurting her in the process. Jia Yu makes her friend Jerry cause trouble so she could make Qi Yi fall in love with her again. Jerry ends up kidnapping Liang Liang, and she finds out that Jia Yu and Jerry ran off to the United States after Qi Yi proposed to her. While Jia Yu only goes out of fear of being tied down, Jerry has true feelings for Jia Yu. To try and make her love him, Jerry does everything Jia Yu says. She ends up using him to try and get back with Qi Yi. Liang Liang reveals her true feelings to Qi Yi in front of Jia Yu and the rest of the staff at GAZE. Qi Yi resigns as CEO of GAZE and becomes one of the directors of Hua Lian (a company GAZE is merging with). He promises Liang Liang that he will always stay by her side. Qi Yi's parents end up remarrying in a joint ceremony along with a couple from GAZE. After these events, Liang Liang thinks out loud about why Qi Yi hasn't proposed to her, deciding that if he won't than she will. Unbeknownst to her, Qi Yi is behind her, listening to her ramblings. He emerges and hands her a box. Inside is a ring placed inside a rose.

Cast

Main cast
Aaron Yan as Qi Yi
Puff Kuo as Cheng Liang Liang
Dean Fujioka as Dean Kamiya
Lyla Lin as Ding Jia Yu

Other Main Cast
Katherine Wang as Kate Liang
Tang Zhen-Gang as Alex

Extended cast
Rim Lin as Ou Lai En 
Lin Yu-pin as Princess 
Zeng Yun Rou  as Meimei 
Ke Ya Xin  as Shi Cui Xia 
Xie Qi Wen  as Li Han Po
Shen Meng-sheng as Qi Yi's father
Xie Qiong Nuan  as Qi Yi's mother
Wang Dao An  as Cheng Shou An 
Yang Li-yin as Liao Tian Feng 
Sun Peng as Ba Si
Lin Yo Wei as Da Yan 
Ma Li Ou as Doctor
Huang Zhen Ni  as Nurse
He Jia Min  as GAZE security guard
Min Xiong  as Zhang Tie Xiong
Wu Zhen Ya  as Accounting Manager
Li Shu Han  as Sales Manager
Chen Bor-jeng as Jiang Hai Bo 
Xu Hao En as Sen 
Tao Chuan Zheng as Mr. Zhao
Liu Shang Qiang as Mr. Zhang 
Doris Kuang as Secretary Chen 
Chang Han as Jerry

Soundtrack

Just You Original TV Soundtrack (OST) (就是要你愛上我 電視原聲帶) was released on March 21, 2014 by various artists under Rock Records Co., Ltd. label. It contains 13 tracks total. The opening theme is track 1 "Beloved (心愛的)" by Genie Chuo and Alien Huang. The closing theme song is "Unstoppable Sun (擋不住的太陽)" by Aaron Yan which is not featured in the soundtrack album since Yan is signed artiste to HIM records.

Track listing

Publications
*August 2, 2014: S-Pop Vol. 8 August 2013 (華流 8月號/2013) - barcode 4717095573604 Sanlih E-Television 三立電視 - Author: Sanlih E-Television 三立電視監製
The main leads Aaron Yan and Puff Kuo are featured on the cover of S-Pop August 2013 regular edition of the magazine.

Episode ratings

Awards and nominations
The 2013 Sanlih Drama Awards Ceremony were held on December 28, 2013 at Sanlih's headquarters and broadcasting studios at No. 159, Section 1, Jiuzong Rd, Neihu District Taipei City, Taiwan.

References

External links
 Just You Official Website on SETTV
Just You website on ETTV

Just You Chinese Wikipedia

2013 Taiwanese television series debuts
2013 Taiwanese television series endings
Sanlih E-Television original programming
Eastern Television original programming
Taiwanese romantic comedy television series